The 2004 Tennis Masters Cup was a tennis tournament played on outdoor hard courts. It was the 35th edition of the year-end singles championships, the 30th edition of the year-end doubles championships, and was part of the 2004 ATP Tour. It took place at the Westside Tennis Club in Houston, Texas, United States, from November 13 through November 21, 2004.

Finals

Singles

 Roger Federer defeated  Lleyton Hewitt, 6–3, 6–2
 It was Federer's 11th title of the year, and his 22nd overall. It was his 2nd consecutive year-end championships title.

Doubles

 Bob Bryan /  Mike Bryan defeated  Wayne Black /  Kevin Ullyett, 4–6, 7–5, 6–4, 6–2

Points and prize money

RR is points or prize money won in the round robin stage.
1 Prize money for doubles is per team.
2 Participation fee for 1 RR match is $45,000 and for 2 RR matches is $70,000.
An undefeated singles champion would earn the maximum 750 points and $1,520,000 in prize money ($120,000 participation, $360,000 undefeated round robin, $370,000 semifinal win, $700,000 final win)
An undefeated doubles champion would earn the maximum 750 points and $220,000 in prize money ($50,000 participation, $45,000 undefeated round robin, $25,000 semifinal win, $100,000 final win). While each of them would get 1,500 points, the $220,000 would be split, so $110,000 for each member of the team.

Points breakdown

Singles

Doubles

1 Malisse and Rochus qualified due to winning French Open and a top 20 finish according to the rules

References

External links
Official website
Singles Finals Draw
Singles round robin draw (Red Group)
Singles round robin draw (Blue Group)
Doubles Finals Draw
Doubles round robin draw (Red Group)
Doubles round robin draw (Blue Group)

 
Tennis Masters Cup
2004
Tennis tournaments in Texas
Sports competitions in Houston
2004 in American tennis
November 2004 sports events in the United States
2004 in sports in Texas
2004 in Houston